Amphidromus inversus is a species of air-breathing land snail, a terrestrial pulmonate gastropod mollusk in the family Camaenidae. 

Like most members of the subgenus Amphidromus, it is chirally dimorphic: within the same populations, both dextral (clockwise-coiled) and sinistral (anticlockwise-coiled) individuals co-exist. This is one of the very few cases of genetic antisymmetry known in nature. Among the subgenus Amphidromus, A. inversus stands out because since c. 2004, it has been the focus of studies aimed at understanding the evolution of chiral dimorphism. Most of these studies have taken place on the Malaysian island of Kapas.

Subspecies 
 Amphidromus inversus andamensis (L. Pfeiffer, 1871)
 Amphidromus inversus annamiticus (Crosse & P. Fischer, 1863)
 Amphidromus inversus koperbergi Laidlaw & Solem, 1961

Distribution 
Sumatra, Peninsular Malaysia, Thailand

Description

Ecology 

Schilthuizen et al. (2005) described spatial structure of population of Amphidromus inversus in Malaysia.

References

Further reading

External links 
 Müller, O. F. (1774). Vermium terrestrium et fluviatilium, seu animalium infusorium, Helminthicorum, et testaceorum, non marinorum, succincta historia. vol 2: I-XXXVI, 1-214, 10 unnumbered pages. Havniae et Lipsiae, apud Heineck et Faber, ex officina Molleriana
 C.; Panha, S. (2006). Taxonomic review of the tree snail Amphidromus Albers, 1850 (Pulmonata: Camaenidae) in Thailand and adjacent areas: Subgenus Amphidromus. Journal of Molluscan Studies. 72(1): 1-30

 photo of sinistral shell

inversus
Gastropods described in 1774